Neil C. Krauter is an American commercial insurance industry executive. He owns the privately held Krauter & Company, which has ten offices in the United States as of 2016.

Early life and education
Krauter graduated from Franklin & Marshall College, where he played lacrosse and earned a B.A. in economics.

Career
Krauter worked at Lloyd's of London, then Marsh & McLennan, and then at Aon Corporation. During the 9/11 attacks, over one thousand Aon employees worked in the South Tower, but "the vast majority" of employees survived the attack, according to MarketWatch. At age 40, he retired and bought a wine store and spent time with his young family.

In 2004–2005, many commercial insurance firms came under fire from New York State Attorney General Eliot Spitzer, who launched a crusade against the industry for insurance firms' presumed conflict of interest payments to brokers known as contingent commissions. Krauter came out of retirement and launched his own self-financed firm known as Krauter & Company in 2004. He wears "bold suspenders"  and dresses like an "investment banker", according to one report, and is a "rainmaker" while former Marsh executive Peggy Stewart "focuses on detail." The firm added nine offices in 11 years, including an office in Houston, Chicago, and Los Angeles.

The firm handles D&O insurance, which is liability insurance payable to a firm's directors and officers if there's damage from a lawsuit for alleged wrongful acts while being in charge. The firm also does property, safety and loss control insurance, including "coverage for private equity firms" as well as "complex risk programs." Competitors include National Support Center LLC, Merkon Cooperative, Tiburon Lockers, Venture Advisors, and Wendel Energy Services. By 2010, there were nine offices across the United States. In 2008, when AIG was offering steep discounts to clients, he commented in Insurance News Net that AIG was not "looking to do ridiculously stupid deals" but that cuts on the casualty business offered by AIG were around 10%. In 2009, with the economic downturn and actions by state regulators, he felt clients were "reaching a point of intolerance".

In 2014, Krauter & Company earned a spot as one of Inc. Magazine’s 5000 fastest-growing private companies in America.

In July 2014, Krauter launched the networking group, Private Equity Principal Group (PEPG) which has currently over 130 members.

Personal life
He lives in Nantucket and Montclair, New Jersey, and has been profiled on VirtualGlobetrotting.com.

References

External links
 Krauter Group website

Year of birth missing (living people)
Living people
American business executives
Businesspeople in insurance
People from New Jersey
Franklin & Marshall College alumni
Businesspeople from New York City